BRCA1-A complex subunit MERIT40 is a protein that in humans is encoded by the BABAM1 gene.

Interactions 
BABAM1 has been shown to interact with BRE.

Repair of DNA damage
MERIT40, the protein product of the BABAM1 gene, is a core component of the deubiquitin complex BRCA1-A.  Other core components of the BRCA1-A complex are the BRCC36 protein (BRCC3 gene), BRE protein (BRE (gene)), and RAP80 protein (UIMC1 gene).  MERIT40 protein binds ubiquitin with high affinity.

BRCA1, as distinct from BRCA1-A,  is employed in the repair of chromosomal damage with an important role in the error-free homologous recombinational (HR) repair of DNA double-strand breaks.  Sequestration of BRCA1 away from the DNA damage site suppresses homologous recombination and redirects the cell in the direction of repair by the process of non-homologous end joining (NHEJ).  The role of BRCA1-A appears to be to bind BRCA1 with high affinity and withdraw it away from the site of DNA damage to the periphery where it remains sequestered, thus promoting NHEJ in preference to HR.

References

External links

Further reading